Automation and Remote Control is a Russian scientific journal published by MAIK Nauka/Interperiodica Press and distributed in English by Springer Science+Business Media.

The journal was established in April 1936 by the USSR Academy of Sciences Department of Control Processes Problems. Cofounders were the Trapeznikov Institute of Control Sciences and the Institute of Information Transmission Problems. The journal covers research on control theory problems and applications. The editor-in-chief is Andrey A. Galyaev. According to the Journal Citation Reports, the journal has a 2020 impact factor of 0.520.

History 
The journal was established in April 1936 and published bimonthly. Since 1956 the journal has been a monthly publication and was translated into English and published in the United States under the title Automation and Remote Control by Plenum Publishing Corporation. During its existence, the scope of the journal substantially evolved and expanded to reflect virtually all subjects concerned in one way or another with the current science of automation and control systems. The journal publishes surveys, original papers, and short communications.

References

External links 
 
  of Russian version 
 Institute of Control Sciences
 Journal page at MAIK Nauka/Interperiodica Press

Systems journals
Engineering journals
Springer Science+Business Media academic journals
Nauka academic journals
Monthly journals
English-language journals
Publications established in 1936
1936 establishments in the Soviet Union